Corynebacterium xerosis is a species of bacteria in the genus Corynebacterium.

References 

Corynebacterium
Bacteria described in 1899